The following is a list of squads for each nation competing at the 2015 FIBA Americas Women's Championship

Pool A











Pool B











References

FIBA Women's AmeriCup
FIBA Women's AmeriCup squads